Xiachengzi railway station is a railway station located in Xiachengzi town, Muling City, Heilongjiang province, People's Republic of China.

It is a station of Harbin–Suifenhe railway, 442 km to Harbin railway station and 106 km to Suifenhe railway station. It is also the starting station of Chengji railway, 107 km to the destination Jixi. Xiachengzi station was built in 1900 with original name Xiaochengzi station. Now it is a level-4 station under China Railway Harbin Group with 6 rails pass by.

Railway stations in Heilongjiang
Railway stations in China opened in 1900